Super 10 may refer to:

Super 10 (rugby union), the rugby union competition held between 1993 and 1995 in the Southern Hemisphere which preceded the Super 12
Top12, the national rugby union competition in Italy, was formerly known as Super 10
Chengdu Super-10 (also known as the J-10C), a proposed variant of the Chengdu J-10 multirole fighter